VSC may refer to:

Organizations
 Venezuela Solidarity Campaign, a British political group
 Vermont State Colleges, the U.S. state of Vermont's system of public colleges
 Vietnam Solidarity Campaign, a Vietnam War-era activist group
 Volunteer Special Constabulary, a component of the Singapore Police Force
 Video Standards Council, of the United Kingdom responsible for promoting standards in the video industry
 Volunteer Service Corp, at Wake Forest University

Places
 Valley Stream Central High School, in Valley Stream, NY, US
 Vermont Studio Center, a fine arts and writing residency program located at Johnson in the US state of Vermont
 Vinings, Smyrna, Cumberland, an area in metropolitan Atlanta, US; See Vinings, Georgia

Science and technology
 Variable structure control, a type of discontinuous nonlinear control
 Vertical service code, a special telephone number that usually begins with the * (star) key
 Vehicle Stability Control (VSC), Toyota's tradename for electronic stability control
 Video spectral comparator, a specialized lighting instrument used to analyze passports and drivers licenses, as part of questioned document examination
 Volatile sulfur compounds, in organic chemistry
 Voltage source converter, a type of power electronics device, see high-voltage direct current

Computing
 Volume Shadow Copy Service, a mechanism of the NTFS file system
 Virtualization Service Client, software used to run Microsoft App-V virtualization software
 .vsc, a file extension used by the Versus programming language and the Viscosity image and animation editing utility
 Visual Studio Code, a source code editor for Windows, Linux and macOS, developed by Microsoft

Other uses

 Aerovías Especiales de Carga (ICAO airline designator), a Colombian airline operator 
 Debreceni VSC, a Hungarian football club
 Vancouver Sleep Clinic, an Australian band
 Vehicle service contract, used for automotive repair, for example see Carchex

 Vertebral subluxation complex, in chiropractic
 Vessel Safety Checks, of recreational boaters; See Missions of the United States Coast Guard 
 Virtual Safety Car